Spyridium globulosum, commonly known as basket bush, is a species of flowering plant in the family Rhamnaceae and is endemic to coastal areas in the south-west of Western Australia. It is a shrub with relatively large leaves and heads of flowers covered with whitish hairs.

Description
The leaves are mostly glabrous above but covered with grey, white or rust-coloured hairs on the lower surface. The heads of flowers are more or less spherical and arranged in dense cymes in leaf axils, the heads rarely longer than the leaves. Flowering occurs from June to November. Populations in the Perth area have leaves that are covered with white hairs on both surfaces.

Taxonomy
Basket bush was first formally described in 1805 by Jacques Labillardière who gave it the name Ceanothus globulosus in his Novae Hollandiae Plantarum Specimen. In 1863, George Bentham changed the name to Spyridium globulosum. The specific epithet (globulosum) means "globe-shaped".

Distribution and habitat
Spyridium globulosum grows on coastal sand dunes and on limestone in near-coastal areas in the Esperance Plains, Geraldton Sandplains, Hampton, Jarrah Forest, Mallee, Swan Coastal Plain and Warren bioregions of south-western Western Australia.

References

globulosum
Rosales of Australia
Rosids of Western Australia
Taxa named by Jacques Labillardière
Plants described in 1805